St. Joseph's Church is a historic Catholic church in the Podgórze district of Kraków, Poland. It is located on Podgórski Square on the northern slopes of the Krzemionki foothills in the south-central part of the city.

History

The church was built between 1905 and 1909, and designed by Jan Sas Zubrzycki in the Gothic Revival style. It is the largest church in the area. 

The interior of the church is shaped in the likeness of a Gothic cathedral in the so-called Gothic Vistula style. It is filled with numerous altars, benches and other items made mostly of wood. Work on the fittings lasted for years.

In the postwar period, the locations of some of the altars and pulpits were changed, as well as a bricked arcade between an ambulatory and the former chapel of the Sacred Heart (now Our Lady of Perpetual Help and Eternal Adoration). The altars created first were the main chapel (in the sanctuary) and the Annunciation (formerly in the right arm of the transept). Work on them was from 1908 to 1909.

The main altar originally consisted of the tabernacle and statues of Saint Joseph. In main altar in the west (right) arm of the transept stands the altar of the Annunciation. There are 5 other main altars.

Restoration

In 1999, the local parish priest, Franciszek Kołacz, decided the church needed restoration. The main altar, side altars, pulpit and organ were renovated. It was also restored to its original colour, which was lost during renovations at the time of pastor Franciszek Mirek, when the colour was changed to red-blue which severely affected the appearance of the church. Today the church has a white-gray colour which has restored it to its former character.

External links
 http://jozef.diecezja.pl/ (official site in Polish)

Joseph
Roman Catholic churches completed in 1909
1909 establishments in Poland
20th-century Roman Catholic church buildings in Poland
Gothic Revival church buildings in Poland